Fitness Gurls is a fitness based magazine. It covers fitness, health, nutrition and exercise routines. The magazine is published bi-monthly in print and digitally. The magazine has been compared to a Maxim for Fitness.

Cover Models
Their cover models are always women who are icons of fitness from the world of sport, fitness and entertainment. Their cover models have included Miesha Tate, Brittney Palmer, Felice Herrig, Audrina Patridge, Arianny Celeste and other UFC fighters. Hope Beel, Paige Hathaway, Torrie Wilson, Chelsea Green and some other fitness models have also appeared on their cover.

References

External links
Official Website

Fitness magazines
Bimonthly magazines published in the United States
Magazines published in Nevada
Magazines with year of establishment missing